Enix was a Japanese video game publishing company founded in September 1975 by Yasuhiro Fukushima. Initially a tabloid publisher named Eidansha Boshu Service Center,  it ventured in 1982 into video game publishing for Japanese home computers such as the PC-8800 series, the X1 series, and the FM-7. Enix initially found games to release by holding contests for programming hobbyists and publishing the winners, with the first titles appearing in February 1983. Enix continued to hold contests and publish the winners through 1993. When Enix moved into traditional publishing for video game consoles in 1985, it began with ports of two of its more successful games, Door Door (1983) and The Portopia Serial Murder Case (1983). From that point onward, Enix served as a publisher for both video games developed independently by other companies as well as for titles in franchises owned by Enix and created by licensed developers. Enix's flagship franchise was the Dragon Quest series of console games, developed primarily by Chunsoft; some of the games, such as Dragon Quest VII (2000), have sold millions of copies, and the series as a whole has sold over 85 million copies as of March 2022.

On April 1, 2003, Enix and Japanese video game developer and publisher Square merged to form Square Enix, with Enix legally absorbing Square. Between 1985 and April 2003, Enix published 95 video games for 56 developers on 12 systems, 65 titles of which were exclusive to Japan. Only one game, King Arthur & the Knights of Justice (1995), was not released in Japan at all, with the remainder appearing in Japan as well as either the North American or PAL regions. Enix served as the Japanese publisher for all of the games released in that region that it was involved in with the exceptions of Paladin's Quest (1992) and Ogre Battle: The March of the Black Queen (1993), where it served solely as the North American publisher.

Games
This list includes retail games published by Enix during its existence under that name after its transition from hobby programming contests to retail publishing in 1985. Only versions of the games that were published by Enix in at least some regions are included; some games have additional ports to other systems that were only published by Square Enix or other publishers. The release dates given are the earliest release of the game by Enix; some games may have been originally published earlier by other publishers in another region.

References 

Video games developed in Japan
Video game lists by company